Shinkawa Station (新川駅) is the name of two train stations in Japan:

Shinkawa Station (Ehime)
Shinkawa Station (Hokkaido)